CKOM is a radio station in Saskatoon, Saskatchewan, Canada broadcasting at 650 kHz. Its format is news/talk. It shares studio space with sister stations CFMC and CJDJ at 715 Saskatchewan Crescent West, also the home of Rawlco Radio's Corporate Offices.

History
CKOM began broadcasting at 1340 kHz on June 8, 1951 with an output of 250 watts and its offices were based out of the historic Empire Hotel. By 1960, CKOM was broadcasting full-time on the AM frequency of 1250 kHz with an increase in power to 10,000 watts. During the earlier part of the decade, the station became a Top 40 station.

In early August 1985, the station was sold to Rawlco Communications and changed frequencies to 650 kHz. At the time, the station continued to air in its Top 40 format. After moving to its 650 AM frequency, the station rebranded as a "Hot Hits" format that was also used in Chicago, Detroit, Baltimore, Philadelphia, and San Francisco. It is known to be the only Hot Hits station in Canada.

In 1998, the station switched to a news/talk format. The station was branded as NTR, and for a brief period of time changed its callsign to CINT before returning to the original callsign CKOM. During this time, the CKOM callsign belonged to the FM station at 102.1 now known as Rock 102.

In September 2006, the station changed its on-air brand to become News Talk 650.

CKOM is part of a two station network along with CJME in Regina. Its daytime lineup consists of Gormley, which is followed by Saskatchewan Afternoon from 12:30-2:00. It's a comprehensive look at the day's stories so far and features some of the best of the day's programming.

The Green Zone with Jamie and Drew" airs from 2:00-6:00, a daily Sports Talk show. Award winning sports person Jamie Nye and multiple local Emmy winning broadcaster and former NHL coach Drew Remenda are joined regularly by some of the biggest names in sports in Saskatchewan and beyond.

At 6PM, it's "The Day in Review," an in-depth wrap on the day's biggest stories, as well as business, and the best of the day's shows.

CKOM has won dozens of national and regional awards, including multiple national Best Radio Newscast awards, as well as recognition for Breaking News coverage, Feature Reporting, Ongoing Coverage, Investigative Reporting, Special Event coverage and Commentary.

The station devotes a significant amount of coverage to the CFL's Saskatchewan Roughriders, which includes coverage preceding and following each game.

In late 2008, the station added the CKOM call letters back to its on-air brand, becoming known as 'News Talk 650 CKOM'.

References

External links
News Talk 650 CKOM
 

Kom
Kom
Kom
Radio stations established in 1951
1951 establishments in Saskatchewan